Claude Rousseau (born 16 June 1953) is a Canadian archer. He competed in the men's individual and team events at the 1992 Summer Olympics.

References

1953 births
Living people
Canadian male archers
Olympic archers of Canada
Archers at the 1992 Summer Olympics
Sportspeople from Quebec